Sand Pond is a small lake located south of the hamlet of French Woods in Delaware County, New York. The pond is also directly adjacent to French Woods Festival Of The Performing Arts. Sand Pond drains south via an unnamed creek that flows into Bouchoux Brook. Pierce Pond is located north of Sand Pond.

See also
 List of lakes in New York

References 

Lakes of New York (state)
Lakes of Delaware County, New York